Piako was a flag station, at the junction of SH26 and Horrell Rd, on the former Thames Branch,  east of Morrinsville and  west of Tatuanui.

The area was owned in succession by politicians:

 Thomas Gillies
 William Murray, who built nearby Annandale House about 1881 and planned a township, hoping the Kinleith Branch junction would be here, rather than Morrinsville
 William Shepherd Allen who built sheep pens and a loading race in May 1890 and stockyards in 1898. The Allen family owned the farm from 1887 to 1920 and still owns Annandale House, which has been a Category 1 listed building since 1989.

Work was continuing when the branch opened to Te Aroha. Murray's had a platform, then a shelter was added in 1887. In December 1912 it was renamed Piako, as had been expected when it opened. It closed to passengers on 22 November 1948. The station building was removed in December 1961 and the stock yards in 1968. The site became Murray Oaks Scenic Reserve in 1975.

References

External links 

 Photo of Annandale House
 1941 aerial photo

Defunct railway stations in New Zealand
Matamata-Piako District
Rail transport in Waikato
Morrinsville
Buildings and structures in Waikato